"Question...?" is a song by American singer-songwriter Taylor Swift, taken from her tenth original studio album, Midnights (2022). Swift wrote and produced the song with Jack Antonoff. A synth-pop track, "Question...?" has lyrics where a narrator ponders on a broken relationship and confronts the ex-lover with a series of rhetorical questions. It samples Swift's 2016 single "Out of the Woods". The song was released as a promotional single from Midnights on October 25, 2022, by Republic Records. An instrumental version was released two days later.

In reviews of Midnights, some critics picked "Question...?" as an album highlight, praising the lyrical details and production. The song peaked at number seven on the US Billboard Hot 100, number 11 on the Billboard Global 200, and within the top-10 on charts of Canada, the Philippines, and Singapore.

Background and release 
On August 28, 2022, during her acceptance speech for Video of the Year for All Too Well: The Short Film at the 2022 MTV Video Music Awards, singer-songwriter Taylor Swift announced her tenth studio album and its release date for October 21. Soon after, Swift revealed the name of the album, Midnights, and its album cover on social networks but the tracklist was not immediately revealed. Jack Antonoff, a musician who has worked with Swift since 1989 (2014), was revealed as one of the producers of the album through a video she posted on her Instagram account on September 6, 2022, titled, "The making of Midnights". On September 21, about a month before the album's release, Swift announced a thirteen episode series called Midnights Mayhem with Me that will be released on the social media platform TikTok, and in each episode the name of one track from the album will be revealed. The title of "Question...?", track number seven, was revealed on the third episode on September 26. The track was released exclusively onto Swift's official website for a limited-time download offer on October 25, 2022. The instrumental version was released two days later.

Music and lyrics 
"Question...?" has a duration of three minutes and thirty seconds. It is a synth-pop song with sharp percussion beats. The track's beginning contains a sample of Swift's 2016 single "Out of the Woods", from the album 1989 (2014). At one point, the production incorporates sounds of a crowd cheering, which are credited to Antonoff, Antonoff's sister Rachel, Swift's brother Austin, and Dylan O'Brien. Some critics compared the song's arrangement and production to Swift's 2014 single, "Blank Space".

In the lyrics, the narrator ruminates on a broken relationship and how things could have turned out differently. The song depicts the narrator as a "good girl" and the ex-lover as a "sad boy" in a big city. In the refrain, she wants to confront the ex-lover with a series of questions ("Did you leave her house in the middle of the night?" "Did you wish you'd put up more of a fight when she said it was too much?" "Do you wish you could still touch her?"), to which the answers she has already known. Alejandra Gularte of Vulture described the song as suitable for an "anxious attached person that gets slightly comfortable with their partner".

Teen Vogue identified probable lyrical references to Swift's previous songs, such as kissing someone in "a crowded room" to "Dress" (from 2017's Reputation) and multiple mentions of late-night encounters with a love interest to many 1989 tracks including "Style", "All You Had to Do Was Stay", and "How You Get the Girl". NPR critic Ann Powers cited the lyrics, "Did you ever have someone kiss you in a crowded room / And every single one of your friends was making fun of you / But 15 seconds later they were clapping too?", as a highlight portraying "a scene of romantic persuasion and betrayal". For Powers, the said lyrics encapsulate women's feelings and anxiety towards how they can be concerned by uncertain love, social pressure, and others' desires for them.

Critical reception 
"Question...?" was met with positive reviews from critics. Carl Wilson from Slate considered the track his counterproposal for Midnights's lead single; he praised the song for "acknowledging the mix of nostalgia and distance that often accompanies such more mature thoughts". Powers was similarly positive, saying that the track "is the kind of story song only Swift can write" and that it captures the emotional sentiments to the details "so acutely that it stings". Spencer Kornhaber of The Atlantic said he was impressed by the song's "twisty storytelling and last-dance wistfulness". The A.V. Club journalist Saloni Gajjar wrote it contains "classic Swift charm and potent use of metaphors", and The Guardian critic Alexis Petridis selected it among the Midnights tracks that are "filled with subtle, brilliant touches". For The New York Times critic Jon Caramanica, "Question...?" is one of the better album songs lyrically. Praising the production, Bobby Olivier from Spin found the track to have a radio hit potential. In Paste, Ellen Johnson lauded the song as a meticulously produced track, with a more nuanced and restrained production compared to common pop music. On a less complimentary side, Craig Jenkins from Vulture deemed the refrain "cloying". Jason Lipshutz of Billboard placed "Question...?" last on his ranking of Midnights tracks, writing that even though it is not the strongest album song, it "boasts some fascinating tidbits to pore over".

Commercial performance 
Following the release of Midnights, "Question...?" opened at number seven on the US Billboard Hot 100; its first-week figures included 31 million streams, 21,400 downloads, and 425,000 airplay impressions. Swift became the first act to simultaneously occupy the entire top-10 of the Hot 100 and the woman with the most top-10 entries (40), exceeding Madonna (38). On the Digital Songs chart, it became Swift's record-extending 24th number-one song, propelled by the limited-time downloads offered via her website. In Canada, the song debuted at number 10 on the Canadian Hot 100 and was certified gold by Music Canada on November 14, 2022. "Question...?" appeared on various national record charts, at number seven in the Philippines and Singapore, at number eight in Malaysia, at number 11 in Australia, at number 15 in Vietnam, at number 20 in Iceland, at number 21 in Portugal, at number 42 in Sweden, at number 62 in Spain, and at 139 in France. The song ultimately peaked at number 11 on the Billboard Global 200.

Accolades

Credits and personnel 
Credits are adapted from Pitchfork.
Recording
 Recorded at Rough Customer Studio (Brooklyn) and Electric Lady Studios (New York City)
 Mixed at MixStar Studios (Virginia Beach)
 Mastered at Sterling Sound (Edgewater, New Jersey)
 Dominik Rivinius's performance was recorded by Ken Lewis at Neon Wave Studio (Pirmasens, Germany)
 Evan Smith's performance was recorded by herself at Pleasure Hill Recording (Portland, Maine)
 Sean Hutchinson's performance was recorded by himself at Hutchinson Sound (Brooklyn)

Personnel

 Taylor Swift – vocals, songwriter, producer
 Jack Antonoff – songwriter, producer, programming, percussion, Juno 6, Mellotron, background vocals, recording, crowd applause
 Dominik Rivinius – drums
 Evan Smith – drums
 Sean Hutchinson – drums, percussion
 Rachel Antonoff – crowd applause
 Austin Swift – crowd applause
 Dylan O'Brien – crowd applause
 Megan Searl – assistant engineer 
 John Sher – assistant engineer
 John Rooney – assistant engineer
 Serban Ghenea – mix engineer
 Bryce Bordone – assistant mix engineer
 Randy Merrill – mastering engineer
 Laura Sisk – recording
 David Hart – recording
 Ken Lewis – recording

Charts

Certifications

Release history

Taylor Swift songs
2022 songs
American synth-pop songs
Songs written by Taylor Swift
Songs written by Jack Antonoff
Song recordings produced by Taylor Swift
Song recordings produced by Jack Antonoff

See also 

 List of Digital Song Sales number ones of 2022

References